Stony Run is a tributary of Buffalo Creek in Union County, Pennsylvania, in the United States. The stream is impacted by nutrient pollution, sediment, E. coli, and thermal radiation. The watershed mostly consists of forested land and agricultural land. It is designated as a High-Quality Coldwater Fishery and a Migratory Fishery. The stream also has a healthy population of benthic macroinvertebrates.

Course

Stony Run begins in West Buffalo Township. It flows east-southeast through a broad valley that it shares with Rapid Run. After more than a mile, the stream enters Buffalo Township. Here, it turns southeast for several tenths of a mile before receiving an unnamed tributary from the left. It then turns southwest for several hundred feet before turning east-southeast again. After several tenths of a mile, it turns southeast and a few tenths of a mile after that, it reaches its confluence with Buffalo Creek.

Hydrology
Stony Run is impacted by nutrient pollution, sediment, E. coli, and thermal radiation.

In 2000, row crops and streambank erosion contributed  of sediment, respectively. A total of  came from hay and pastures,  came from low-density urban land, and  came from other sources.

In 2000,  of nitrogen came from groundwater/subsurface water. Another  came from row crops and  came from hay and pastures.  came from low-density urban land,  came from septic systems,  came from streambank erosion, and  came from other sources.

In 2000, row crops contributed  of phosphorus to the stream, while groundwater/subsurface water contributed  and hay and pastures contributed . A total of  came from low-density urban land,  came from septic systems,  came from streambank erosion, and  came from miscellaneous sources.

Geography and geology

There are no fences along any streams in the watershed of Stony Run. However, there could eventually be  of fences. No stream reach in the watershed has stabilization, but up to  could potentially be stabilized. Forest Hill is located near the headwaters of Stony Run.

A debris fan from the late Pleistocene occurs in the vicinity of Stony Run.

Watershed
The stream is entirely within the United States Geological Survey quadrangle of Mifflinburg. Of these,  are on agricultural land. The mouth of the stream is near Cowan.

A total of 61 percent of the watershed of Stony Run is on forested land. Another 32 percent is on agricultural land and 3 percent is on impervious surfaces. The area of land on impervious surfaces could potentially rise to 30 percent.

None of the agricultural land in the watershed of Stony Run is on slopes of more than 3 percent. There are no unpaved roads in the stream's watershed.

The watershed of Stony Run makes up 1 percent of the Buffalo Creek drainage basin.

History
Stony Run was entered into the Geographic Names Information System on August 2, 1979. Its identifier in the Geographic Names Information System is 1188794.

The John Umstead tract, which was located along Stony Run, was surveyed by Thomas Sutherland on May 17, 1770.

In a 2008 report, the watershed of Stony Run was ranked tenth amongst sub-watersheds in the Buffalo Creek drainage basin for restoration priority.

Biology
The drainage basin of Stony Run is designated as a High-Quality Coldwater Fishery and a Migratory Fishery. The stream has a population of benthic macroinvertebrates that has been described as "healthy".

The pathogen load in Stony Run is on the order of 6.842 × 1015 organisms per month. The largest contributor of pathogens is urban areas (6.738 × 1015 organisms per month). Farm animals contribute 1.034 × 1014 organisms per month, septic systems contribute 3.287 × 1011 organisms per month, and wildlife contributes 1.745 × 1011 organisms per month. The pathogen load could in the future be reduced by 1.16 percent to 6.762 × 1015 organisms per month.

See also
Beaver Run (Buffalo Creek), next tributary of Buffalo Creek going downstream
Rapid Run (Buffalo Creek), next tributary of Buffalo Creek going upstream
List of rivers of Pennsylvania

References

Rivers of Union County, Pennsylvania
Tributaries of Buffalo Creek (West Branch Susquehanna River)
Rivers of Pennsylvania